Rhopalovalva grapholitana is a species of moth of the family Tortricidae. It is found in China (Hebei, north-eastern China, Shanghai, Anhui, Jiangxi, Henan, Shaanxi, Gansu, Ningxia), Korea and Russia.

The larvae feed on Lespedeza bicolor.

References

Moths described in 1916
Eucosmini